Trunk Highway 167 (MN 167) is a state highway in Yellow Medicine County, Minnesota.  It was created in 2022 from a portion of MN 67 that closed after the roadbed began to collapse.  MN 67 was rerouted around the closure at the same time MN 167 was established.

Route description
MN 167 begins at an intersection with MN 23 and MN 67 in Granite Falls, Minnesota near a sharp bend in the Minnesota River.  It heads to the southeast and curves around meanders in the river's course.  It passes through the Upper Sioux Community before reaching Upper Sioux Agency State Park.  The route ends at the entrance road to the state park.

History
The closure was necessary due to unstable ground deep underneath the roadbed, causing large cracks to appear in the road surface and rendering it impassable for traffic. A detour was put into place that followed State Highway 274 and County Road 2 and between Granite Falls and Echo. MnDOT permanently rerouted MN 67 along this detour and announced the creation of MN 167 on September 27, 2022.

Major intersections

Notes

References

External links
*

167
Transportation in Yellow Medicine County, Minnesota